The  was an electric multiple unit (EMU) train type operated by the private railway operator Nagoya Railroad (Meitetsu) in Japan from 2003 until September 2015. The unique four-car train was converted from a former 1030/1230 series trainset which sustained accident damage in 2002.

Formations
The single four-car set, numbered 1384, was formed as follows.

 The M2' and Mc2 cars each had one lozenge-type pantograph.

Interior
Passenger accommodation consisted of a mixture of transverse seating with flip-over seat backs and some longitudinal seating.

History

The 1380 set was introduced in 2003, reformed from former 1030/1230 series six-car set 1134, which sustained damage to the limited express (1030 series) cars in a level crossing accident in 2002. The limited express cars were scrapped, and a new cab was added to the former intermediate car 1384, creating a new four-car set for use on commuter services. The train was also repainted from the original red and white limited express livery into the standard Meitetsu commuter train livery of all-over red.

Set 1384 made its last run on 2 September 2015, before being taken out of service.

References

External links

 Meitetsu 1380 series information 

Electric multiple units of Japan
1380 series
Train-related introductions in 2003

ja:名鉄1000系電車#1380系
Nippon Sharyo multiple units
1500 V DC multiple units of Japan